Inierie is a stratovolcano located in the south-central part of the island of Flores, Indonesia, overlooking the Savu Sea. It is the highest volcano on the island.

The volcano looms over the little town of Bajawa and its upper slopes are bare without any vegetation.

The volcano is not active but there were reports of smoke emerging from the crater in June 1911.

See also 
 List of volcanoes in Indonesia

References 
 

Mountains of Flores Island (Indonesia)
Inierie
Inierie